Luke Vincent Lockwood was born February 1, 1872, in Brooklyn, New York, the son of Luke A. Lockwood and his wife, Mary Louise Lyon, daughter of Captain William Lyon and Catherine Mead. 

Lockwood was the fifth great-grandson of the English immigrant and Greenwich colonist, Robert Lockwood and his wife, Susan Norman, daughter of Captain Richard Norman. 

Lockwood was a lawyer and an author in the field of furniture design of the Federal Period in United States.  He has been termed the "pioneering furniture scholar" in America. He married on November 16, 1897, Alice Gardner Burnell. He died January 23, 1951, at Greenwich, Connecticut. He was also a very active member of Acacia Lodge No. 85 of Ancient, Free and Accepted Masons in Greenwich, Connecticut.

Selected works
 Colonial Furniture in America, Luke Vincent Lockwood, Scribner Publishers (1901)

See also
Duncan Phyfe
Hepplewhite
Lyre arm
Thomas Sheraton

Line notes

External links
 

American furniture designers
1872 births
1951 deaths